Paul-Werner Scheele (6 April 1928	– 10 May 2019) was a German Catholic prelate and theologian. Born in Olpe, Scheele was ordained to the priesthood in 1952, and appointed Auxiliary Bishop of Paderborn in 1975. In 1979, he became the Bishop of Würzburg, serving until his retirement in 2003.

Scheele died on 10 May 2019 in Würzburg, at the age of 91.

References

External links 

1928 births
2019 deaths
20th-century German Catholic theologians
21st-century German Catholic theologians
20th-century German Roman Catholic bishops
People from Olpe, Germany
21st-century German Roman Catholic bishops
20th-century German Roman Catholic priests
21st-century Roman Catholic bishops in Germany